The Gando massacre was a mass murder committed by the Japanese military against the Korean residents of Gando (present-day Jiandao, Yanbian Korean Autonomous Prefecture, Jilin, China), after the Hunchun incident.

The massacre occurred over a period of three weeks starting in October 1920, the day of the Hunchun Incident after the Battle of Qingshanli. During this period, soldiers of the Imperial Japanese Army murdered Korean civilians who numbered an estimated at least 5,000, and perpetrated widespread rape.

See also
Battle of Qingshanli
Jinan incident
Kantō Massacre
Nanjing Massacre

References

1920 in China
Anti-Korean sentiment in Japan
Anti-Korean violence
History of Yanbian
Massacres in China
Mass murder in 1920
Massacres in 1920
Massacres committed by Japan